The former Second Church of Christ, Scientist is a historic Christian Science church building located at Central Park West and West 68th Street on the Upper West Side of Manhattan, New York City, within the Central Park West Historic District. The Beaux-Arts building was designed by architect Frederick R. Comstock and constructed in 1899–1901.  The building was restored beginning in 2005 by Sydness Architects which planned to clean the facade, reinforce the stained-glass windows, and waterproof the copper dome and illuminate the skylight.

In 2003 Second Church of Christ, Scientist merged with First Church of Christ, Scientist, whose building  at 96th Street was later sold to the Crenshaw Christian Center. The merged congregation used the name First Church of Christ, Scientist, but worshiped at the former Second Church on 68th Street.

References

External links
 CSNYC listing for First Church of Christ, Scientist, Central Park West & W. 68th

Central Park West Historic District
Christian Science churches in New York City
Churches in Manhattan
Churches on the National Register of Historic Places in New York (state)
Properties of religious function on the National Register of Historic Places in Manhattan
Historic district contributing properties in Manhattan